Streaplers is a Swedish musical group, founded  1959 in Kungälv as a pop group and later developed into a dansband. Original members were Gert Lengstrand (vocals), Bjarne Lundquist, Göran Liljeblad, Håkan Liljeblad och Lars Larsson.

The group made a breakthrough with Säkkinjärven Polka in 1963. Hit songs such as Diggety Doggety, Mule Skinner Blues and Rockin' Robin followed. Singer Gert Lengstrand left the group in 1966, and was replaced by Curt Borkman. Since then the band began development towards playing dansband music. Robert Löfvendahl became the new singer in 1969. The same year, the band had a Svensktoppen number one hit with "Tusen öars land". In 1970, Ove Pilebo began as singer and Streaplers became one of Sweden's most popular dansbands, with 225 concerts. As a dansband, they had many Svensktoppen hits, like "Valentino", "Va' har du under blusen, Rut? ", "Jag har en dröm" and "Till min kära", which during the period 1995-1997 was on the list for 73 weeks, 22 of the hits made first place.

Today, the twins Håkan an Göran are the only original members.  The other members are Kenny Samuelsson, Anders Larsson (taking over when Lasse Larsson left the band, Anders is Lasse's brother's son) and Kjetil Granli.

Members

Vocals 
1959-1966: Gert Gert Lengstrand
1967-1969 Curt Borkman
1969-1970: Robert Löfvendahl
1970-1984: Ove Pilebo
1984-1990: Towe Wideberg
1990-1997: Bosse Möllberg
1997-: Kenny Samuelsson

Bass 
1959-2013: Håkan Liljeblad
2013- : Per Lundin

Guitar 
1959-2009: Göran Liljeblad
2009-2014: Henrik Uhlin
2014-2022: Henrik Göransson
2022- : Maxi Jäsklid

Drums 

1959-1963: Mats Alfredsson
1963-1988: Bjarne Lundqvist
1988-1990: Kent Szwonder
1990-: Kjetil Granli

Keyboard 

1995-2004: Lars Larsson
2003-2003: Jörgen Flach (replacing Lars Larsson when the latter was sick)
2004-: Anders Larsson

Discography

Albums
(Selective - charting albums with peak position in Swedish Albums Chart parenthesis)

References

External links 
Official website 

Musical groups established in 1959
Dansbands
Swedish pop music groups
1959 establishments in Sweden